The 1991 Walker Cup, the 33rd Walker Cup Match, was played on 5 and 6 September 1991, at Portmarnock Golf Club, Portmarnock, County Dublin, Ireland. The event was won by the United States 14 to 10.

Format
The format for play on Thursday and Friday was the same. There were four matches of foursomes in the morning and eight singles matches in the afternoon. In all, 24 matches were played.

Each of the 24 matches was worth one point in the larger team competition. If a match was all square after the 18th hole extra holes were not played. Rather, each side earned ½ a point toward their team total. The team that accumulated at least 12½ points won the competition. If the two teams were tied, the previous winner would retain the trophy.

Teams
Ten players for the United States and Great Britain & Ireland participated in the event plus one non-playing captain for each team.

Great Britain & Ireland
 & 
Captain:  George Macgregor
 Andrew Coltart
 Gary Evans
 Pádraig Harrington
 Garry Hay
 Garth McGimpsey
 Paul McGinley
 Jim Milligan
 Jim Payne
 Liam White
 Ricky Willison

United States

Captain: Jim Gabrielsen
Allen Doyle
David Duval
David Eger
Franklin Langham
Bob May
Phil Mickelson
Tom Scherrer
Jay Sigel
Mike Sposa
Mitch Voges

Thursday's matches

Morning foursomes

Afternoon singles

Friday's matches

Morning foursomes

Afternoon singles

References

Walker Cup
Golf tournaments in the Republic of Ireland
Golf in County Dublin
Walker Cup
Walker Cup
Walker Cup